Michael Paradinas (born 26 September 1971), better known by his stage name μ-Ziq (pronounced "music" or mu-zik), is an English electronic musician from Wimbledon, London. He was associated with the electronic style intelligent dance music (IDM) during the 1990s, and recorded on Rephlex Records and Reflective Records. His critically acclaimed 1997 album, Lunatic Harness, helped define the drill 'n' bass subgenre and was also his most successful release, selling over 100,000 copies. Paradinas founded the record label Planet Mu, begun in 1995, where he has championed genres such as juke and footwork.

History

Paradinas was born in Charing Cross and began playing keyboards during the early 1980s, and listened to new wave music such as Orchestral Manoeuvres in the Dark (OMD), Heaven 17 and early Human League. He joined a few bands in the mid-1980s, then spent eight years on keyboards for the group Blue Innocence.

During this period, Paradinas had been recording on his own as well with synthesizers and a four-track recorder. In 1995, following a performance at "The Orange" in London, Blue Innocence broke up. Paradinas and the bass player, Francis Naughton, bought sequencing software and re-recorded some of Paradinas's older tracks. After the material was played for Mark Pritchard and Tom Middleton—the duo behind Global Communication and the heads of Evolution Records—it was to be released; however, recording commitments later forced Pritchard and Middleton to withdraw their agreement. Fortunately for Paradinas, Richard D. James (a.k.a. Aphex Twin) had also heard the tracks and agreed to release their music on Rephlex Records under the alias μ-Ziq.

Naughton then left μ-Ziq to start Rocket Goldstar. A second album Bluff Limbo was scheduled to be released in mid-1994, though only 1000 copies were published. It was re-issued by Rephlex in 1996 after Paradinas served papers on the label. Paradinas's first major-label release came later in 1994, after he undertook a remix project for Virgin Records: the remix EP The Auteurs Vs μ-Ziq for the britpop band the Auteurs. The remixes Paradinas offered sounded nothing like the original song, a familiar practice for many experimental electronic musicians in those times.

Even though the EP was hardly a high sales success, Virgin signed up Paradinas and gave him his own sublabel, Planet Mu, to release his own work and to develop similar-minded artists. (Paradinas later broke with Virgin and in 1998 established Planet Mu as his own independent label). Written into his own contract was a provision for unlimited recording under different names, and during 1995 Paradinas unveiled three aliases and released many albums within less than a year. The neo-electro music label Clear released his debut single under the alias Tusken Raiders (named after the Star Wars species) early in the year. Clear Records also released the first Paradinas alias album, Jake Slazenger MakesARacket, later in 1995. Although they were still audible, the LP ignored the electro influences in favour of some synthesizer figures and the previously unheard influence of jazz-funk. Paradinas continued to release solo albums under the above-mentioned names as well as Gary Moscheles, and a one-time collaboration with Aphex Twin under the Mike & Rich moniker.

In 1997, Paradinas made a style change again, mixing experimental electronic music with drum'n'bass, a similar aesthetic path taken by Squarepusher and Aphex Twin. During this year he was also touring with popular musician Björk. Björk inspired the 1999 album Royal Astronomy, with its mixture of unusual vocals, strings and breakbeat. All of his albums until 2003 were released in the US on the more mainstream label, Astralwerks.

Personal life
Paradinas is married to fellow musician Lara Rix-Martin, with whom he has produced music under the alias Heterotic.

Discography

As μ-Ziq

Studio albums

EPs
 The Auteurs vs μ-Ziq (1994)
 Salsa with Mesquite (1995)
 Urmur Bile Trax, Vols. 1 & 2 (1997)
 Brace Yourself (1998)
 "The Raft" EP (1999)
 XTEP (2013)
 Rediffusion (2014)
 Pthagonal EP (2017)
 D Funk EP (2018)
 Hello (2022)

Singles
 Phi*1700 (U/V) (1994)
 My Little Beautiful (1997)
 The Fear (1999)
 Ease Up (2005)
 Goodbye / Goodbye Remixes (2022)

Compilations
 XTLP (2015)
 Furthur Electronix Trax (2022)

As Tusken Raiders / Rude Ass Tinker
 Bantha Trax (1995)
 Bantha Trax, Vol. 2 (1999)
 The Motorbike Track (1999)
 Imperial Break (2001)
 Inchstar Static EP (2018)
 Bantha Trax, Vol. 3 (2020)
 Housewerk EP Series, Vols. 1–6 (2021)
 Boundary Road (2021)
 Bantha Trax, Vol. 4 (2022)
 Housewerk, Vol. 7 (2022)

As Jake Slazenger
 Makesaracket (1995)
 Megaphonk (1995)
 Nautilus (1996)
 Das ist ein Groovybeat, ja (1996)
 Pewter Dragon (2006)
 Drops a Deuce (2020)
 Ace in the Hole (2020)

As Kid Spatula
 Spatula Freak (1995)
 Full Sunken Breaks (2000)
 Meast (2004)

As Gary Moscheles
 Shaped to Make Your Life Easier (1996)

As Frost Jockey
 Burgundy Trax, Vol. 1  (2000)
 Burgundy Trax, Vol. 2  (2000)

Collaborations

Diesel M (with Marco Jerrentrup)
 M for Multiple (1993)

Mike & Rich (with Richard D. James a.k.a. Aphex Twin)
 Expert Knob Twiddlers (1996)

Slag Boom Van Loon (with Jochem Paap a.k.a. Speedy J)
 Slag Boom Van Loon (1998)
 So Soon (2001)

Heterotic (with Lara Rix-Martin)
 Love & Devotion (2013)
 Rain (2014)
 Weird Drift (2014)

(with Mrs Jynx)
 Secret Garden (2021)

References

1971 births
Living people
English electronic musicians
English people of Spanish descent
English record producers
Intelligent dance musicians
People from Wimbledon, London
Braindance musicians
Planet Mu artists
Rephlex Records artists